M92 or M-92 may refer to:

 Messier 92, a globular cluster in the Hercules constellation
 M-92 (Michigan highway), a state highway in Michigan
 Beretta 92FS, a model of Beretta handgun
 Beretta 92 Models, a list of Beretta 92 model handguns and their relatives
 Zastava M92, a shortened assault rifle based on the AK-47
 Gefechtshelm M92, a combat helmet of the German Bundeswehr